The fourth season begin on June 7, 2010 showing the new contestants. On June 8, 2010 the couples were announced for both teams. It was also announced that at the time of nomination, both partners would be nominated. At the beginning of this season the horary was changed to 16:00 hrs and a few days was not aired due to the 2010 World Cup. On July 12 the singer Karen Paola joined Calle 7 after leaving Yingo.

Teams

Original teams

New teams

Teams competition

week for training
competed with Longhi
nominated on July 1
release of the telenovela 40 y tantos
replaced by Phillipe
replaced by Paz
on Monday, the teams were changed
replaced by Paz
competed with JC
replaced by Camila A.
replacing Paz
replaced by JC
none for the bicentennial
replaced by Maite
Maite and Francisco P. were replaced by Paz Gómez and Phillipe due to a trip to the USA
Laura P. was his partner
none due to the Chilean Miners Rescue
replaced by Camila Nash
competed with Felipe
replaced by JC
replaced by Chapu and Maite

Individual competition

External links
 Official website

2010 Chilean television seasons